Minuscule 202 (in the Gregory-Aland numbering), ε 242 (Soden), is a Greek minuscule manuscript of the New Testament, on parchment. Paleographically it has been assigned to the 12th century. It has marginalia.

Description 

The codex contains the complete text of the four Gospels on 278 parchment leaves (size ). Pauline epistles followed after Catholic epistles. It is written in one column per page, in 21 lines per page, in light-brown or dark-brown ink, capital letters in gold. It is a "splendid copy".

There is also a division according to the Ammonian Sections (in Mark 234 sections - the last in 16:9), with references to the Eusebian Canons (written below Ammonian Section numbers).

It uses "iota adscript".

Text 

The Greek text of the codex is a representative of the Byzantine text-type. Hermann von Soden included it to the textual family Kx. Aland placed it in Category V.
According to the Claremont Profile Method it represents textual family Kx and creates cluster 202.

The Pericope Adulterae (John 7:53-8:11) is marked by an obelus.

History 

Formerly the manuscript belonged to the monastery S. Marco in Florence (together with Add MSS 14770 and 14771). Later it belonged to Samuel Butler Bishop of Lichfield. It was purchased from Payne and Foss, on 16 November 1843.

It was examined by Birch and Bloomfield. C. R. Gregory saw it in 1883.

It is currently housed at the British Library (Add MS 14774) in London.

See also 
 List of New Testament minuscules
 Biblical manuscript
 Textual criticism

References

Further reading

External links 
 Add MS 14774 at the British Library

Greek New Testament minuscules
12th-century biblical manuscripts
British Library additional manuscripts